Walenty Gawrychowski (born March 16, 1870, Gawrychy, Poland) was a bishop.

Early life and education

He was the son of John and Julia Wierzbocki Gawrychowski. He had three brothers, two of whom were Roman Catholic priests in Poland and the third a professor in a high school in Warsaw, and two sisters. His parents were community leaders in Gawrychy, a town named after his family. As a child the young Walenty Gawrychowski was educated in the grammar and high schools of the town of Suwalki, Poland. In later years he was graduated from the academy and seminary at Warsaw. He was ordained a priest of the Roman Catholic Church at Warsaw in 1893 by Archbishop Popiel.

Career

His first sermon, delivered with the ardor of a young and virile youth, was directed against the oppressive rule of Poland by the Russian Czar and the German Emperor. A gendarme of the Czar, attending the service, sought to effect the arrest of the young priest for seditious utterances against the Czar. However, friends spirited him away and he was taken aboard a ship bound for America to escape exile to Siberia that otherwise would have followed his arrest.

In America, he first served as a professor in the Roman Catholic Seminary at Orchard Lake, Michigan. But in 1896, two years after his arrival in the United States, he renounced his vows as a Roman Catholic priest. He became a priest of the Independent Polish Roman Catholic Church and later of the Polish National Catholic Church.

Gawrychowski organized twenty-five parishes, one of which was Holy Mother of the Rosary Parish in Chicopee. He organized or was pastor of the churches at Dickson City, Pennsylvania; Buffalo, New York; Chicago, IL.; Baltimore, MD; Bayonne, NJ; Philadelphia, PA.; Central Falls, Rhode Island; Woonsocket, Rhode Island; Bridgeport, Connecticut; and other cities. Adept in organizational ability, Father Gawrychowski was able, in a short period of time, to stabilize a given parish so that the parish could receive a pastor. He would leave to aid other parishes or to organize potential parishes. He was the vice-president of the First General Synod of the Polish National Catholic Church and an active co-worker of Bishop Francis Hodur.

Gawrychowski was elected as a candidate for bishop at the Third General Synod of the Polish National Catholic Church in 1914. He was consecrated in Scranton, Pennsylvania on August 17, 1924, by Prime Bishop Francis Hodur. He was appointed diocesan bishop of the newly formed Eastern Diocese. He returned to Chicopee, Massachusetts as Diocesan Bishop in 1925 and assumed the pastorate of Holy Mother of the Rosary Parish. Nearly all of his adult life had been devoted to the organization of new parishes in the eastern part of the United States.

When World War I ended and Poland emerged as an independent republic, Gawrychowski was sent to Poland several times on missionary work to establish parishes of the Polish National Catholic Church there. In 1931 Gawrychowski was assigned as Bishop Ordinary of the Polish National Catholic Church in Poland, and fulfilled this temporary assignment until a permanent assignment was made for that position.

Death

Gawrychowski died on February 1, 1934, in the rectory of Holy Mother of the Rosary Parish, 26 Bell Street, Chicopee. He was buried at Holy Mother of the Rosary Parish Cemetery. The cemetery altar, which was constructed in 1961 in his memory and in memory of the organizers of Holy Mother of the Rosary Parish, was built such that his remains are located under the altar steps.

References

External links
Valentine P. Gawrychowski Bequest to Harvard College Library

American bishops
American Old Catholics
Bishops of the Polish National Catholic Church
1870 births
1934 deaths
American people of Polish descent